Baghelah-ye Olya (also Romanized as Bāghelah-ye ‘Olyā) is a village in Darb-e Gonbad Rural District, Darb-e Gonbad District, Kuhdasht County, Lorestan Province, Iran. At the 2006 census, its population was 220, in 41 families.

References 

Towns and villages in Kuhdasht County